Ripley County Courthouse is a historic courthouse located at Versailles, Ripley County, Indiana.  It was built between 1860 and 1863, and is a three-story, cross plan, Greek Revival style brick building. It features a bell tower and high pitched gable roof.  An addition was constructed in 1971–1972.

It was added to the National Register of Historic Places in 2009.

References
 

County courthouses in Indiana
Courthouses on the National Register of Historic Places in Indiana
Greek Revival architecture in Indiana
Government buildings completed in 1863
Buildings and structures in Ripley County, Indiana
National Register of Historic Places in Ripley County, Indiana
1863 establishments in Indiana